Cognitive biases are systematic patterns of deviation from norm and/or rationality in judgment. They are often studied in psychology, sociology and behavioral economics.

Although the reality of most of these biases is confirmed by reproducible research, there are often controversies about how to classify these biases or how to explain them. Several theoretical causes are known for some cognitive biases, which provides a classification of biases by their common generative mechanism (such as noisy information-processing). Gerd Gigerenzer has criticized the framing of cognitive biases as errors in judgment, and favors interpreting them as arising from rational deviations from logical thought.

Explanations include information-processing rules (i.e., mental shortcuts), called heuristics, that the brain uses to produce decisions or judgments. Biases have a variety of forms and appear as cognitive ("cold") bias, such as mental noise, or motivational ("hot") bias, such as when beliefs are distorted by wishful thinking. Both effects can be present at the same time.

There are also controversies over some of these biases as to whether they count as useless or irrational, or whether they result in useful attitudes or behavior. For example, when getting to know others, people tend to ask leading questions which seem biased towards confirming their assumptions about the person. However, this kind of confirmation bias has also been argued to be an example of social skill; a way to establish a connection with the other person.

Although this research overwhelmingly involves human subjects, some findings that demonstrate bias have been found in non-human animals as well. For example, loss aversion has been shown in monkeys and hyperbolic discounting has been observed in rats, pigeons, and monkeys.

Belief, decision-making and behavioral
These biases affect belief formation, reasoning processes, business and economic decisions, and human behavior in general.

Anchoring bias 

The anchoring bias, or focalism, is the tendency to rely too heavily—to "anchor"—on one trait or piece of information when making decisions (usually the first piece of information acquired on that subject).
Anchoring bias includes or involves the following:
 Common source bias, the tendency to combine or compare research studies from the same source, or from sources that use the same methodologies or data.
 Conservatism bias, the tendency to insufficiently revise one's belief when presented with new evidence.
 Functional fixedness, a tendency limiting a person to using an object only in the way it is traditionally used.
 Law of the instrument, an over-reliance on a familiar tool or methods, ignoring or under-valuing alternative approaches. "If all you have is a hammer, everything looks like a nail."

Apophenia 

The tendency to perceive meaningful connections between unrelated things.
The following are types of apophenia:
 Clustering illusion, the tendency to overestimate the importance of small runs, streaks, or clusters in large samples of random data (that is, seeing phantom patterns).
 Illusory correlation, a tendency to inaccurately perceive a relationship between two unrelated events.
 Pareidolia, a tendency to perceive a vague and random stimulus (often an image or sound) as significant, e.g., seeing images of animals or faces in clouds, the man in the Moon, and hearing non-existent hidden messages on records played in reverse.

Availability heuristic 

The availability heuristic (also known as the availability bias) is the tendency to overestimate the likelihood of events with greater "availability" in memory, which can be influenced by how recent the memories are or how unusual or emotionally charged they may be. The availability heuristic includes or involves the following:
 Anthropocentric thinking, the tendency to use human analogies as a basis for reasoning about other, less familiar, biological phenomena.
 Anthropomorphism or personification, the tendency to characterize animals, objects, and abstract concepts as possessing human-like traits, emotions, and intentions. The opposite bias, of not attributing feelings or thoughts to another person, is dehumanised perception, a type of objectification.
 Attentional bias, the tendency of perception to be affected by recurring thoughts.
 Frequency illusion or Baader–Meinhof phenomenon. The frequency illusion is that once something has been noticed then every instance of that thing is noticed, leading to the belief it has a high frequency of occurrence (a form of selection bias). The Baader–Meinhof phenomenon is the illusion where something that has recently come to one's attention suddenly seems to appear with improbable frequency shortly afterwards. It was named after an incidence of frequency illusion in which the Baader–Meinhof Group was mentioned.
 Implicit association, where the speed with which people can match words depends on how closely they are associated.
 Salience bias, the tendency to focus on items that are more prominent or emotionally striking and ignore those that are unremarkable, even though this difference is often irrelevant by objective standards. See also von Restorff effect.
 Selection bias, which happens when the members of a statistical sample are not chosen completely at random, which leads to the sample not being representative of the population.
 Survivorship bias, which is concentrating on the people or things that "survived" some process and inadvertently overlooking those that did not because of their lack of visibility.
 Well travelled road effect, the tendency to underestimate the duration taken to traverse oft-travelled routes and overestimate the duration taken to traverse less familiar routes.

Cognitive dissonance 

 The Normalcy bias, a form of cognitive dissonance, is the refusal to plan for, or react to, a disaster which has never happened before.
 Effort justification is a person's tendency to attribute greater value to an outcome if they had to put effort into achieving it. This can result in more value being applied to an outcome than it actually has. An example of this is the IKEA effect, the tendency for people to place a disproportionately high value on objects that they partially assembled themselves, such as furniture from IKEA, regardless of the quality of the end product.
 Ben Franklin effect, where a person who has performed a favor for someone is more likely to do another favor for that person than they would be if they had received a favor from that person.

Confirmation bias 

Confirmation bias is the tendency to search for, interpret, focus on and remember information in a way that confirms one's preconceptions. There are multiple other cognitive biases which involve or are types of confirmation bias:
 Backfire effect, a tendency to react to disconfirming evidence by strengthening one's previous beliefs. The existence of this bias as a widespread phenomenon has been disputed in empirical studies.
 Congruence bias, the tendency to test hypotheses exclusively through direct testing, instead of testing possible alternative hypotheses.
 Experimenter's or expectation bias, the tendency for experimenters to believe, certify, and publish data that agree with their expectations for the outcome of an experiment, and to disbelieve, discard, or downgrade the corresponding weightings for data that appear to conflict with those expectations.
 Observer-expectancy effect, when a researcher expects a given result and therefore unconsciously manipulates an experiment or misinterprets data in order to find it (see also subject-expectancy effect).
 Selective perception, the tendency for expectations to affect perception.
 Semmelweis reflex, the tendency to reject new evidence that contradicts a paradigm.

Egocentric bias 

Egocentric bias is the tendency to rely too heavily on one's own perspective and/or have a higher opinion of oneself than reality. The following are forms of egocentric bias:
 Bias blind spot, the tendency to see oneself as less biased than other people, or to be able to identify more cognitive biases in others than in oneself.
 False consensus effect, the tendency for people to overestimate the degree to which others agree with them.
 False uniqueness bias, the tendency of people to see their projects and themselves as more singular than they actually are.
 Forer effect or Barnum effect, the tendency for individuals to give high accuracy ratings to descriptions of their personality that supposedly are tailored specifically for them, but are in fact vague and general enough to apply to a wide range of people. This effect can provide a partial explanation for the widespread acceptance of some beliefs and practices, such as astrology, fortune telling, graphology, and some types of personality tests.
 Illusion of asymmetric insight, where people perceive their knowledge of their peers to surpass their peers' knowledge of them.
 Illusion of control, the tendency to overestimate one's degree of influence over other external events.
 Illusion of transparency, the tendency for people to overestimate the degree to which their personal mental state is known by others, and to overestimate how well they understand others' personal mental states.
 Illusion of validity, the tendency to overestimate the accuracy of one's judgments, especially when available information is consistent or inter-correlated.
 Illusory superiority, the tendency to overestimate one's desirable qualities, and underestimate undesirable qualities, relative to other people. (Also known as "Lake Wobegon effect", "better-than-average effect", or "superiority bias".)
 Naïve cynicism, expecting more egocentric bias in others than in oneself.
 Naïve realism, the belief that we see reality as it really is—objectively and without bias; that the facts are plain for all to see; that rational people will agree with us; and that those who do not are either uninformed, lazy, irrational, or biased.
 Overconfidence effect, a tendency to have excessive confidence in one's own answers to questions. For example, for certain types of questions, answers that people rate as "99% certain" turn out to be wrong 40% of the time.
 Planning fallacy, the tendency for people to underestimate the time it will take them to complete a given task.
 Restraint bias, the tendency to overestimate one's ability to show restraint in the face of temptation.
 Trait ascription bias, the tendency for people to view themselves as relatively variable in terms of personality, behavior, and mood while viewing others as much more predictable.
 Third-person effect, a tendency to believe that mass-communicated media messages have a greater effect on others than on themselves.

Extension neglect 

The following are forms of extension neglect:
 Base rate fallacy or base rate neglect, the tendency to ignore general information and focus on information only pertaining to the specific case, even when the general information is more important.
 Compassion fade, the tendency to behave more compassionately towards a small number of identifiable victims than to a large number of anonymous ones.
 Conjunction fallacy, the tendency to assume that specific conditions are more probable than a more general version of those same conditions.
 Duration neglect, the neglect of the duration of an episode in determining its value.
 Hyperbolic discounting, where discounting is the tendency for people to have a stronger preference for more immediate payoffs relative to later payoffs. Hyperbolic discounting leads to choices that are inconsistent over time—people make choices today that their future selves would prefer not to have made, despite using the same reasoning. Also known as current moment bias or present bias, and related to Dynamic inconsistency. A good example of this is a study showed that when making food choices for the coming week, 74% of participants chose fruit, whereas when the food choice was for the current day, 70% chose chocolate.
 Insensitivity to sample size, the tendency to under-expect variation in small samples.
 Less-is-better effect, the tendency to prefer a smaller set to a larger set judged separately, but not jointly.
 Neglect of probability, the tendency to completely disregard probability when making a decision under uncertainty.
 Scope neglect or scope insensitivity, the tendency to be insensitive to the size of a problem when evaluating it. For example, being willing to pay as much to save 2,000 children or 20,000 children.
 Zero-risk bias, the preference for reducing a small risk to zero over a greater reduction in a larger risk.

False priors 

Biases based on false priors include:
 Agent detection, the inclination to presume the purposeful intervention of a sentient or intelligent agent.
 Automation bias, the tendency to depend excessively on automated systems which can lead to erroneous automated information overriding correct decisions.
 Gender bias, a widespread set of implicit biases that discriminate against a gender. For example, the assumption that women are less suited to jobs requiring high intellectual ability. Or the assumption that people or animals are male in the absence of any indicators of gender.
 Sexual overperception bias, the tendency to overestimate sexual interest of another person in oneself, and Sexual underperception bias, the tendency to underestimate it.
 Stereotyping, expecting a member of a group to have certain characteristics without having actual information about that individual.

Framing effect 

The framing effect is the tendency to draw different conclusions from the same information, depending on how that information is presented. Forms of the framing effect include:
 Contrast effect, the enhancement or reduction of a certain stimulus's perception when compared with a recently observed, contrasting object.
 Decoy effect, where preferences for either option A or B change in favor of option B when option C is presented, which is completely dominated by option B (inferior in all respects) and partially dominated by option A.
 Default effect, the tendency to favor the default option when given a choice between several options.
 Denomination effect, the tendency to spend more money when it is denominated in small amounts (e.g., coins) rather than large amounts (e.g., bills).
 Distinction bias, the tendency to view two options as more dissimilar when evaluating them simultaneously than when evaluating them separately.
 Domain neglect bias, the tendency to neglect relevant domain knowledge while solving interdisciplinary problems.

Logical fallacy 

Logical fallacy biases include:
 Berkson's paradox, the tendency to misinterpret statistical experiments involving conditional probabilities.
 Escalation of commitment, irrational escalation, or sunk cost fallacy, where people justify increased investment in a decision, based on the cumulative prior investment, despite new evidence suggesting that the decision was probably wrong.
 G.I. Joe fallacy, the tendency to think that knowing about cognitive bias is enough to overcome it.
 Gambler's fallacy, the tendency to think that future probabilities are altered by past events, when in reality they are unchanged. The fallacy arises from an erroneous conceptualization of the law of large numbers. For example, "I've flipped heads with this coin five times consecutively, so the chance of tails coming out on the sixth flip is much greater than heads."
 Hot-hand fallacy (also known as "hot hand phenomenon" or "hot hand"), the belief that a person who has experienced success with a random event has a greater chance of further success in additional attempts.
 Illicit transference, occurs when a term in the distributive (referring to every member of a class) and collective (referring to the class itself as a whole) sense are treated as equivalent. The variants of this fallacy are the fallacy of composition and the fallacy of division.
 Plan continuation bias, failure to recognize that the original plan of action is no longer appropriate for a changing situation or for a situation that is different from anticipated.
 Subadditivity effect, the tendency to judge the probability of the whole to be less than the probabilities of the parts.
 Time-saving bias, a tendency to underestimate the time that could be saved (or lost) when increasing (or decreasing) from a relatively low speed, and to overestimate the time that could be saved (or lost) when increasing (or decreasing) from a relatively high speed.
 Zero-sum bias, where a situation is incorrectly perceived to be like a zero-sum game (i.e., one person gains at the expense of another).

Prospect theory 

The following relate to prospect theory:
 Ambiguity effect, the tendency to avoid options for which the probability of a favorable outcome is unknown.
 Disposition effect, the tendency to sell an asset that has accumulated in value and resist selling an asset that has declined in value.
 Dread aversion, just as losses yield double the emotional impact of gains, dread yields double the emotional impact of savouring.
 Endowment effect, the tendency for people to demand much more to give up an object than they would be willing to pay to acquire it.
 Loss aversion, where the perceived disutility of giving up an object is greater than the utility associated with acquiring it. (see also Sunk cost fallacy)
 Pseudocertainty effect, the tendency to make risk-averse choices if the expected outcome is positive, but make risk-seeking choices to avoid negative outcomes.
 Status quo bias, the tendency to prefer things to stay relatively the same.
 System justification, the tendency to defend and bolster the status quo. Existing social, economic, and political arrangements tend to be preferred, and alternatives disparaged, sometimes even at the expense of individual and collective self-interest.

Self-assessment 
 Dunning–Kruger effect, the tendency for unskilled individuals to overestimate their own ability and the tendency for experts to underestimate their own ability.
 Hot-cold empathy gap, the tendency to underestimate the influence of visceral drives on one's attitudes, preferences, and behaviors.
 Hard–easy effect, the tendency to overestimate one's ability to accomplish hard tasks, and underestimate one's ability to accomplish easy tasks.
 Illusion of explanatory depth, the tendency to believe that one understands a topic much better than one actually does. The effect is strongest for explanatory knowledge, whereas people tend to be better at self-assessments for procedural, narrative, or factual knowledge.
 Impostor Syndrome, a psychological occurrence in which an individual doubts their skills, talents, or accomplishments and has a persistent internalized fear of being exposed as a fraud.  Also known as impostor phenomenon.
 Objectivity illusion, the phenomena where people tend to believe that they are more objective and unbiased than others. This bias can apply to itself - where people are able to see when others are affected by the objectivity illusion, but unable to see it in themselves. See also bias blind spot.

Truthiness 

 Belief bias, an effect where someone's evaluation of the logical strength of an argument is biased by the believability of the conclusion.
 Illusory truth effect, the tendency to believe that a statement is true if it is easier to process, or if it has been stated multiple times, regardless of its actual veracity. These are specific cases of truthiness.
 Rhyme as reason effect, where rhyming statements are perceived as more truthful. 
 Subjective validation, where statements are perceived as true if a subject's belief demands it to be true. Also assigns perceived connections between coincidences. (Compare confirmation bias.)

Other

Social

Association fallacy 

Association fallacies include:
 Authority bias, the tendency to attribute greater accuracy to the opinion of an authority figure (unrelated to its content) and be more influenced by that opinion.
 Cheerleader effect, the tendency for people to appear more attractive in a group than in isolation.
 Halo effect, the tendency for a person's positive or negative traits to "spill over" from one personality area to another in others' perceptions of them (see also physical attractiveness stereotype).

Attribution bias 

Attribution bias includes:
 Actor-observer bias, the tendency for explanations of other individuals' behaviors to overemphasize the influence of their personality and underemphasize the influence of their situation (see also Fundamental attribution error), and for explanations of one's own behaviors to do the opposite (that is, to overemphasize the influence of our situation and underemphasize the influence of our own personality).
 Defensive attribution hypothesis, a tendency to attribute more blame to a harm-doer as the outcome becomes more severe or as personal or situational similarity to the victim increases.
 Extrinsic incentives bias, an exception to the fundamental attribution error, where people view others as having (situational) extrinsic motivations and (dispositional) intrinsic motivations for oneself
 Fundamental attribution error, the tendency for people to overemphasize personality-based explanations for behaviors observed in others while under-emphasizing the role and power of situational influences on the same behavior (see also actor-observer bias, group attribution error, positivity effect, and negativity effect).
 Group attribution error, the biased belief that the characteristics of an individual group member are reflective of the group as a whole or the tendency to assume that group decision outcomes reflect the preferences of group members, even when information is available that clearly suggests otherwise.
 Hostile attribution bias, the tendency to interpret others' behaviors as having hostile intent, even when the behavior is ambiguous or benign.
 Intentionality bias, the tendency to judge human action to be intentional rather than accidental.
 Just-world hypothesis, the tendency for people to want to believe that the world is fundamentally just, causing them to rationalize an otherwise inexplicable injustice as deserved by the victim(s).
 Moral luck, the tendency for people to ascribe greater or lesser moral standing based on the outcome of an event.
 Puritanical bias, the tendency to attribute cause of an undesirable outcome or wrongdoing by an individual to a moral deficiency or lack of self-control rather than taking into account the impact of broader societal determinants .
 Self-serving bias, the tendency to claim more responsibility for successes than failures. It may also manifest itself as a tendency for people to evaluate ambiguous information in a way beneficial to their interests (see also group-serving bias).
 Ultimate attribution error, similar to the fundamental attribution error, in this error a person is likely to make an internal attribution to an entire group instead of the individuals within the group.

Conformity 

Conformity is involved in the following:
 Availability cascade, a self-reinforcing process in which a collective belief gains more and more plausibility through its increasing repetition in public discourse (or "repeat something long enough and it will become true"). See also availability heuristic.
 Bandwagon effect, the tendency to do (or believe) things because many other people do (or believe) the same. Related to groupthink and herd behavior.
 Courtesy bias, the tendency to give an opinion that is more socially correct than one's true opinion, so as to avoid offending anyone.
 Groupthink, the psychological phenomenon that occurs within a group of people in which the desire for harmony or conformity in the group results in an irrational or dysfunctional decision-making outcome. Group members try to minimize conflict and reach a consensus decision without critical evaluation of alternative viewpoints by actively suppressing dissenting viewpoints, and by isolating themselves from outside influences.
 Groupshift, the tendency for decisions to be more risk-seeking or risk-averse than the group as a whole, if the group is already biased in that direction
 Social desirability bias, the tendency to over-report socially desirable characteristics or behaviours in oneself and under-report socially undesirable characteristics or behaviours. See also: .
 Truth bias is people's inclination towards believing, to some degree, the communication of another person, regardless of whether or not that person is actually lying or being untruthful.

Ingroup bias 

Ingroup bias is the tendency for people to give preferential treatment to others they perceive to be members of their own groups. It is related to the following:
 Not invented here, an aversion to contact with or use of products, research, standards, or knowledge developed outside a group.
 Outgroup homogeneity bias, where individuals see members of other groups as being relatively less varied than members of their own group.

Other social biases

Memory  

In psychology and cognitive science, a memory bias is a cognitive bias that either enhances or impairs the recall of a memory (either the chances that the memory will be recalled at all, or the amount of time it takes for it to be recalled, or both), or that alters the content of a reported memory. There are many types of memory bias, including:

Misattribution of memory 

The misattributions include:
 Cryptomnesia, where a memory is mistaken for novel thought or imagination, because there is no subjective experience of it being a memory.
 False memory, where imagination is mistaken for a memory.
 Social cryptomnesia, a failure by people and society in general to remember the origin of a change, in which people know that a change has occurred in society, but forget how this change occurred; that is, the steps that were taken to bring this change about, and who took these steps. This has led to reduced social credit towards the minorities who made major sacrifices that led to the change in societal values.
 Source confusion, episodic memories are confused with other information, creating distorted memories.
 Suggestibility, where ideas suggested by a questioner are mistaken for memory.
 The Perky effect, where real images can influence imagined images, or be misremembered as imagined rather than real

Other

See also

Footnotes

References

External links
 

 
Cognitive biases
Behavioral finance